The turquoise cotinga or Ridgway's cotinga (Cotinga ridgwayi) is a species of bird in the family Cotingidae. It is found in Costa Rica and western Panama. Its natural habitats are tropical moist forests and plantations from the lowlands into lower mountain regions. It is threatened by deforestation.

References

Found mostly in San Vito area but reaches as far as north as Carara National Park. A rather elusive bird most years it follows fruit phenology. Nothing is known about its nesting or sexual habits. No sounds recorded yet. Solitary or in couples. The best locations to be found are La Amistad Lodge, Las Mellizas-San Vito and Pacifico Lodge area close to Carara National Park.

Further reading

External links
BirdLife Species Factsheet.

Cotinga (genus)
Birds described in 1887
Birds of Costa Rica
Birds of Panama
Taxa named by Robert Ridgway
Taxonomy articles created by Polbot
Isthmian–Pacific moist forests